The High Sheriff of Lancashire is an ancient officer, now largely ceremonial, granted to Lancashire, a county in North West England. High Shrievalties are the oldest secular titles under the Crown, in England and Wales. The High Sheriff of Lancashire is the representative of the monarch in the county, and is the "Keeper of The King's Peace" in the county, executing judgements of the High Court through an Under Sheriff.

Throughout the Middle Ages, the High Sheriff was a powerful political position; the sheriffs were responsible for the maintenance of law and order and various other roles. Some of its powers were relinquished in 1547 as the Lord Lieutenant of Lancashire was instated to deal with military duties. It was in 1908 under King Edward VII of the United Kingdom that the Lord Lieutenant position became more senior than the High Sheriff. Since that time the High Sheriff has broadly become an honorific title, with many of its previous roles having been taken up by High Court judges, magistrates, coroners, local authorities, and the police.

The sheriff conventionally serves for a term of a year, with the term of office starting in March. Unlike other counties, the honour in Lancashire is bestowed by the monarch in their role as Duke of Lancaster, by pricking the Lites. This page lists persons to have held the position, and is divided by sovereign state and Royal house. Another list of sheriffs of Lancashire from 1087 to 1886 is compiled in Edward Baines's "History of the County Palatine and Duchy of Lancaster". This names many other individuals for the earliest years of the office.

In April 2015 Amanda Parker of Browsholme Hall, Clitheroe, became High Sheriff and launched a website to promote the office: .

Part of the Kingdom of England

House of Plantagenet

1150–1160 Bertram de Bulmer of Brancepeth and Sheriff Hutton
1160–1162 Geoffrey de Valoignes of Farleton and Cantsfield
1162–1166 Sir Bertram de Bulmer of Brancepeth and Sheriff Hutton
1166–1170 William de Vesci, Lord of Alnwick
1170–1173 Roger de Herleberga
1173–1174 Ranulf de Glanvill
1174–1185 Ralph FitzBernard
1185–1185 Hugo Pipard
1185–1188 Gilbert Pipard
1188–1189 Peter Pipard
1189–1194 Richard de Vernon (1st term)
1194–1194 Theobald Walter, 1st Baron Butler
1194–1196 Benedict Garnet, of Caton
1196–1197 Robert de Vavasour of Hazelwood, Tadcaster
1197–1198 Nicholas le Boteler
1198–1199 Stephen of Thornham
1199–1200 Robert de Tatteshall, near Pontefract
1200–1204 Richard de Vernon (2nd term)
1204–1205 Sir William Vernon
1205–1215 Gilbert FitzReinfrid, Baron of Kendal
1205–1215 Adam FitzRoger of Yealand (1st term)
1215–1216 Reginald de Cornhill of Kent
1216–1217 Ranulph de Blundevill
1217–1222 Jordan FitzRoger
1223–1223 Stephen de Segrave
1223–1226 Robert de Montjoy
1226–1227 William de Ferrers, 4th Earl of Derby
1227–1228 Gerard Etwell of Etwall, Derbyshire
1228–1232 Sir Adam de Yealand (2nd term)
1232–1232 Peter de Rivaux
1232–1233 William de Lancaster, Baron of Kendal
1233–1234 Gilbert de Wyteby
1234–1240 Simon de Thornton "Clericus"
1240–1241 John de Lancaster
1241–1245 Robert de Waterfal
1245–1246 Richard le Boteler
1246–1247 Sir Matthew de Redmayne, Lord of Levens
1247–1255 Sir Robert de Lathum
1255–1259 Sir Patrick de Ulvesby
1259–1259 Sir William le Boteler, Lord of Warrington
1259–1261 Sir Geoffrey de Chetham
1261–1264 Sir Adam de Montalt
1264–1267 Roger de Lancaster, Lord of Rydal
1267–1269 Edmund, 1st Earl of Lancaster
1269–1270 Sir Richard le Boteler of Rawcliffe, Fylde
1270–1272 John de Cansfield of Aldingham
1272–1274 Sir Ranulph de Dacre of Dacre, Cumberland
1274–1284 Sir Henry de Lea of Preston
1284–1290 Gilbert de Clifton
1291–1298 Sir Ralph de Montjoy
1298–1298 Thomas, 2nd Earl of Lancaster
1298–1301 Richard de Hoghton
1301–1307 Sir Thomas Travers
1307–1309 William Gentyl the elder of Poulton-le-Sands
1309–1315 Sir Ralph de Bickerstath of Bickerstaffe (died of wounds after Battle of Preston, 1315)
1315–1317 Sir Edmund de Neville from Hornby
1317–1320 Sir Henry de Malton of Malton, Yorkshire
1320–1322 William Gentyl the younger
1322–1323 Robert de Leyburn (1st term)
1323–1323 John Darcy
1323–1326 Sir Gilbert de Southworth of Southworth, Warrington
1326–1326 Robert de Leyburn (2nd term, died in office)
1326–1327 Sir Geoffrey de Warburton
1327–1327 Henry, 3rd Earl of Lancaster
1327–1328 John de Burghton
1328–1329 John de Hamburg
1329–1332 Sir John de Denum
1332–1335 Robert Foucher
1335–1336 William de Clapham of Clapham, Yorkshire
1336–1337 Sir William le Blount (killed in office)
1337–1342 Robert de Radcliffe of Ordsall, Salford
1342–1344 Sir John le Blount (brother of Sir William, HS 1336)
1344–1345 Stephen de Ireton
1345–1345 Henry, 1st Duke of Lancaster
1345–1350 John Cockayne
1350–1358 Sir William Scargill
1358–1359 William de Radcliffe
1359–1361 Nicholas de Coleshill
1361–1361 Sir John de Ipres
1361–1362 Adam de Hoghton
1362–1371 John of Gaunt, 1st Duke of Lancaster
1371–1371 Richard de Radcliffe
1371–1374 Sir John le Boteler of Warrington and Beausay
1374–1377 Richard de Towneley
1377–1384 Sir Nicholas Haryngton of Farleton in Lonsdale
1384–1387 Sir Ralph de Radcliffe of Blackburn and Smithills Hall
1387–1392 Robert de Standish
1392–1397 Sir John le Boteler
1397–1399 Richard Molyneux

House of Lancaster

1399–1399 Sir Richard de Hoghton of Hoghton Tower
1399–1401 Sir Thomas Gerard of Bryn Hall, Ashton-in-Makerfield, Lancs.
1401–1404 Sir John de Boteler
1404–1405 Sir Ralph Radcliffe
1405–1406 John Boteler
1406–1411 Sir John Bold
1411–1415 Sir Ralph Staveley
1415–1416 Sir Robert de Urswyk
1416–1418 Nicholas de Longford
1418–1422 Sir Robert Lawrence
1423–1426 Richard Radcliffe
1426–1437 Robert Laurence of Ashton
1439–1449 Sir John Byron of Clayton Hall
1449–1461 Nicholas Byron

House of York

1461–1462 John Broughton of Broughton
1462–1464 Sir John Assheton of Ashton-under-Lyne
1464–1465 John Pilkington of Pilkington
1465–1466 Thomas Pilkington of Pilkington
1466–1473 Sir Robert Urswick  of Urswick
1473–1480 Thomas Molyneux of Sefton
1480–1485 Sir Thomas Pilkington of Pilkington

House of Tudor

1485–1497 Sir Edward Stanley of Hornby Castle
1497–1524 Lawrence Starkie of Huntroyde
1523 Sir Alexander Radcliffe of Ordsall
1524 Sir William Molyneux of Sefton Hall
1526 Henry Farington of Farington, Leyland and Old Worden Hall
1527 Sir William Leylond of Morley in Astley
1528 Sir Alexander Osbaldestone of Osbaldestone
1529 Sir Alexander Radcliffe
1530 Sir Richard Assheton of Middleton Hall
1531 Henry Farington of Farington, Leyland and Old Worden Hall
1532 Sir John Towneley of Towneley
1533 Sir Edmund Trafford of Trafford Park
1534 Sir Thomas Langton of Newton-in-Makerfield
1535 Sir Thomas Boteler of Bewsey
1536 Thomas Shireburne of Aighton and Mitton
1536 Hugh Adlington of Adlington and Duxbury
1537 Sir Thomas Halsall of Halsall
1538 John Holcroft of Melling
1539 Sir Alexander Radcliffe
1540 Sir William Laylond of Morley-in-Astley
1541 Sir Richard Hoghton of Lea and Hoghton
1542 Sir Thomas Southworth of Southworth and Samlesbury Halls.
1543 John Holcroft of Melling
1544 Sir Marmaduke Tunstall of Thurland Castle
1545 Sir William Norris of Speke Hall
1546 Sir Thomas Holcroft of Vale Royal
1547 Sir Alexander Radcliffe of Ordsall
1548 Sir Thomas Gerard of Bryn
1549 Sir Robert Worsley of Boothes
1550 Sir Peter Legh of Hayock
1551 Sir John Atherton of Atherton Hall, Leigh
1552 Sir Thomas Talbot of Lower Darwen
1553 Sir Thomas Gerard of Bryn
1554 Sir Marmaduke Tunstall of Thurland Castle
1555 Sir John Atherton of Atherton Hall, Leigh
1556 Sir Thomas Langton of Newton-in-Makerfield
1557 Sir Edmund Trafford of Trafford Park
1558 Sir Thomas Gerard of Bryn Hall
1559 John Talbot of Salesbury
1560 Sir Robert Worsley of Booths
1561 Sir John Atherton of Atherton Hall, Leigh
1562 Sir John Southworth of Samlesbury Hall
1563 Sir Thomas Hesketh of Rufford Old Hall
1564 Thomas Hoghton of Hoghton
1565 Sir Edmund Trafford of Trafford
1566 Sir Richard Molyneux of Sefton
1567 Sir Thomas Langton of Newton-in-Makefield
1568 Edward Holland of Denton Hall
1569 John Preston of Preston Hall, Westmorland
1570 Thomas Boteler of Bewsey and Warrington
1571 Edmund Trafford of Trafford
1572 John Byron of Clayton Hall.
1573 Richard Holland of Denton Hall and Heaton Hall
1574 William Booth of Barton
1575 Francis Holt of Gristlehurst, Bury
1576 Richard Bold of Bold, Warrington
1577 Robert Dalton of Thurnham Hall
1578 John Fleetwood of Penwortham
1579 Ralph Assheton of Middleton
1580 Sir Edmund Trafford of Trafford
1581 Sir John Byron of Clayton Hall
1582 Richard Holland of Denton
1583 John Atherton of Atherton Hall
1584 Sir Edmund Trafford of Trafford
1585 Thomas Preston of Preston Hall
1586 Richard Assheton of Middleton
1587 John Fleetwood of Penwortham
1588 Thomas Talbot of Bashall
1589 Sir Richard Molyneux of Sefton
1590 Richard Bold of Bold, Warrington
1591 James Assheton of Chadderton
1592 Edward Fitton (the younger) of Gawsworth Old Hall
1593 Richard Assheton of Middleton
1594 Ralph Assheton of Great Lever
1595 Thomas Talbot of Bashall
1596 Richard Holland of Denton
1597 Sir Richard Molyneux of Sefton
1598 Richard Assheton of Middleton
1599 Sir Richard Hoghton of Hoghton
1600 Robert Hesketh of Rufford and Martholme
1601 Cuthbert Halsall of Halsall
1602 Sir Edmund Trafford of Trafford
1603 John Ireland of Hale

House of Stuart

1604	Sir Nicholas Mosley of Manchester
1605	Ralph Barton of Bolton-le-Moors
1606	Edmund Fleetwood of Rossall
1607	Sir Richard Assheton of Middleton
1608	Robert Hesketh of Rufford Old Hall
1609	Sir Edmund Trafford of Trafford	
1610	Roger Nowell of Read Hall
1611	John Fleming of Coniston Hall
1612	Sir Cuthbert Halsall of Halsall
1613	Robert Bindlosse of Borwick Hall	
1614	Richard Shireburne of Stonyhurst
1615	Edward Stanley of Bickerstaffe
1616	Rowland Mosley of Hough End, Manchester
1617	Sir Edmund Trafford of Trafford		
1618	Richard Shuttleworth of Gawthorpe Hall	
1619	John Holt of Stubley	
1620	Leonard Ashawe of Ashawe
1621	Edward Moore of Bank Hall, Liverpool	
1622	Sir Gilbert Ireland of Hale Hall, Childwall	
1623	Sir George Booth of Ashton-under-Lyne
1624	Sir Ralph Assheton of Whalley
1625	Edward Holland of Denton
1626	Roger Kirkbye of Kirkby Ireleth
1627	Sir Edward Stanley of Bickerstaffe
1628	Edmund Assheton of Chadderton
1629	Edward Rawsthorne of Edenfield
1630	Thomas Hesketh of Rufford Old Hall
1631	Richard Bold of Bold Hall, St Helens
1632	Nicholas Towneley of Royle, Burnley
1633	Ralph Assheton of Middleton
1634	Ralph Standish of Standish
1635	Sir Humphrey Chetham. of Clayton Hall
1636	William Farrington of Leyland
1637	Richard Shuttleworth of Gawthorpe Hall
1638	Roger Kirkby of Kirkby Ireleth
1639	Sir Edward Stanley of Bickerstaffe
1640	Robert Holt of Castleton
1641	Peter Egerton of Shaw Hill, Flixton
1642	Sir John Girlington of Thurland Castle
1643	Sir Gilbert Hoghton of Hoghton Tower
1644–1647 John Bradshaw of Bradshaw Hall, Bolton
1648	Gilbert Ireland of Hale Hall, Childwall

Commonwealth

1649 Humphrey Cheeton 
1649 John Hartley of Strangeways, Manchester
1650 Edmund Hopwood of Hopwood Hall, Middleton
1651 Henry Wrigley of Chamber Hall, Oldham
1652 Alexander Barlow of Barlow, Salford
1653 John Parker of Extwistle, Clitheroe
1654 Peter Bold of Bold Hall, Warrington
1655–1656 John Atherton of Atherton
1656 John Starkie of Huntroyde Hall
1657 Hugh Cooper of Chorley and Carnforth
1658 Sir Robert Bindlosse, 1st Baronet of Borwick Hall, Carnforth
1659 Sir Richard Hoghton, 3rd Baronet of Hoghton Tower

House of Stuart, restoration

1660 George Chetham of Clayton Hall
1661 Sir George Middleton of Leighton Hall, Carnforth
1663 John Girlington of Thurland Castle
1664 Thomas Preston of Holker, Furness
12 November 1665: William Spencer, of Ashton Hall
7 November 1666: Sir John Ardene, of Harden
6 November 1667: Thomas Greenhalgh, of Brandlesholme
6 November 1668: Thomas Greenhalgh, of Brandlesholme
11 November 1669: Christopher Banastre of Bank Hall, Bretherton
4 November 1670: Sir Henry Sclater, of Light Oaks, near Leigh
9 November 1671: Sir Robert Bindlosse, 1st Baronet, of Borwick Hall, Carnforth
11 November 1672: Sir Robert Bindlosse, 1st Baronet, of Borwick Hall, Carnforth
12 November 1673: Sir Peter Brooke, of Astley Hall
5 November 1674:  Alexander Butterworth, of Belfield, Butterworth
10 November 1676: Alexander Rigby, of Layton, Poulton-le-Fylde
14 November 1678: Sir Roger Bradshaigh, 1st Baronet, of Haigh Hall, near Wigan
1 December 1679: William Johnson, of Rishton Grange, Clitheroe
30 October 1680: Lawrence Rawstane, of New Hall, Edenfield
1682–1683 Thomas Legh of Bank, Leyland
1684–1685 Peter Shakerley of Shakerley, Tyldesley
1686–1688 William Spencer of Ashton Hall
1689 John Birch of Birch Hall, Manchester
1690 Peter Bold of Bold, Warrington
1691 Alexander Rigby of Whittle-le-Woods and Layton, Liverpool
1692 Francis Lindley of Bowling Hall
1693 Thomas Rigby of Whittle-le-Woods
1694 Thomas Ashurst of Ashurst, near Wigan
1695 Richard Spencer of Preston
1696 Thomas Norreys of Speke Hall, Liverpool
1697 Roger Mainwaring of Clitheroe
1698 William West of Middleton, Near Heysham
1699 Robert Dukinfield of Dukinfield, Ashton-under-Lyne
1700 Thomas Rigby of Goosnargh
1701 William Hulme of Davyhulme, near Manchester
1702 Roger Nowell of Read Hall, Blackburn
1703 Peter Egerton of Shaw Hill, near Manchester
1704 George Birch then Thomas Birch of Birch Hall, Rusholme
1705 Richard Spencer of Preston
1706 Christopher Dauntesey of Agecroft

Part of the Kingdom of Great Britain

House of Stuart, restoration

1707	Edmund Cole of Beaumont Cote, Lancaster
1708	Myles Sandys of Graythwaite Hall, Furness
1709	Roger Kirkby (died Feb 1709) of Kirby-Ireleth, Furness then Alexander Hesketh
1710	Robert Parker of Cuerden Hall
1711	Sir Thomas Standish of Duxbury Hall
1712	William Rawstorne of Edenfield and Penwortham
1713	Richard Valentine of Eccles
1714	William Farington of Leyland

House of Hanover

1715	Jonathan Blackburne of Orford Hall, Warrington
1716	Thomas Crisp of Parbold, nr. Wigan
1717	Samuel Crooke of the Old Crook, Leyland
1718	Richard Norris of Speke Hall
1719	Thomas Stanley of Clitheroe
1720	Robert Mawdesley of Mawdesley, Near Ormskirk
1721	Benjamin Hoghton of Hoghton Tower
1722	Benjamin Gregge of Chamber Hall, near Oldham
1723	Sir Edward Stanley of Bickerstaffe, near Ormskirk
1724	William Tatham of Ireby, near Kirkby Lonsdale
1725	Miles Sandy of Graythwaite Hall, Hawkeshead
1726	Edmund Hopwood of Hopwood Hall, Middleton
1727	Daniel Wilson of Dalham Tower, near Milnthorpe
1728	Joseph Yates of Stanley House, Manchester
1729	William Greenhaigh of Myerscough, near Preston
1730	James Chetham of Smedley
1731	William Leigh of Westhoughton
1732	John Parker of Breightmet, near Bolton
1733	John Greaves of Culcheth, near Leigh
1734	William Bushell of Preston
1735	Arthur Hamilton of Liverpool
1736	Sir James Darcy Lever of Alkrington Hall, Manchester
1737	Thomas Horton of Chadderton Hall
1738	Samuel Chetham of Turton Tower and Castleton
1739	Sir Ralph Assheton of Middleton
1740	Roger Hesketh of North Meols, Southport
1741	Robert Dukinfield of Manchester
1742	Robert Bankes of Winstanley Hall, near Wigan
1743	John Blackburne of Orford Hall, Warrington
1744	Robert Radclyffe of Foxdenton Hall, Chadderton
1745	Daniel Willis of Prescot
1746	William Shawe of Preston
1747	Samuel Birch of Ardwick (father of Samuel Birch (military officer))
1748	George Clarke of Hyde Hall, Manchester
1749	Rigby Molyneux of Preston
1750	Charles Stanley of Ormskirk
1751	James Fenton of Lancaster
1752	Richard Townley of Belfield Hall, Butterworth, Rochdale
1753	John Bradshaw of Manchester
1754	Thomas Hesketh of Rufford Old Hall
1755	Thomas Johnson of Manchester
1756	James Barton of Penwortham, Preston
1757	James Bayley of Withington, Manchester
1758	Robert Gibson of Myerscough
1759	Richard Whitehead of Claughton, near Preston
1760	Samuel Hilton of Pennington, Leigh
1761	Sir William Farington of Shaw Hall, Leyland
1762	Thomas Braddyll of Conishead, Ulverston
1763	Thomas Blackburne of Hale and Orford Hall, Warrington
1764	Sir William Horton, 1st Baronet of Chadderton
1765	John Walmesley of Wigan
1766	Edward Gregge of Oldham
1767	Alexander Butler of Kirkland Hall
1768	Thomas Butterworth Bayley of Pendleton
1769	Dorning Rasbotham of Farnworth
1770	Nicholas Ashton of Liverpool
1771	Sir Ashton Lever of Alkrington Hall Middleton
1772	William Cunliffe Shawe of Singleton Lodge, Preston
1773	Thomas Patten of Bank Hall, Warrington
1774	Geoffrey Hornby of Preston
1775	Sir Watts Horton, 2nd Baronet of Chadderton Hall
1776	Lawrence Rawsthorne of Edenfield
1777	Samuel Clowes of Chorlton
1778	Wilson Gale-Braddyll of Conishead
1779	John Clayton of Carr Hall, Little Harwood
1780	 John Atherton of Walton Hall, Liverpool
1781	John Blackburne of Orford Hall, Warrington
1782	Sir Frank Standish of Duxbury Hall
1783	James Whalley, later Sir James Whalley-Smythe-Gardiner, 2nd Baronet of Whalley
1784	William Bankes of Wigan
1785	John Sparling of Liverpool
1786	Sir John Parker Mosley, 1st Baronet of Ancoats
1787	William Bamford of Bury
1788	Edward Falkner of Liverpool
1789	William Hulton of Hulton Park, near Bolton
1790	Charles Gibson of Lancaster
1791	James Starky of Heywood, Lancashire
1792	William Assheton of Preston and Clitheroe
1793	Thomas Townley Parker of Preston
1794	Henry Philip Hoghton of Hoghton Tower and Walton
1795	Robinson Shuttleworth of Preston
1796	Richard Gwillym of Warrington
1797	Bold Fleetwood Hesketh of Southport
1798	John Entwistle of Rochdale
1799	Joseph Starkie of Oldham
1800	James Ackers of Liverpool

Part of the United Kingdom

House of Hanover

1801 Sir Thomas Dalrymple Hesketh of Rufford New Hall
1802 Robert Gregge Hopwood of Middleton
1803 Isaac Blackburne of Orford
1804 Thomas Lister Parker of Clitheroe
1805 Meyrick Holme Bankes of Wigan
12 February 1806: Le Gendre Piers Starkie, of Huntroyde Hall
1807 Richard Crosse Legh of Shaw Hill, near Chorley
1808 Thomas Clayton of Carr Hill, Little Harwood
6 February 1809: Samuel Clowes, of Broughton Hall
1810 William Hulton of Hulton Park; instigator of the Peterloo massacre
14 February 1811: Samuel Chetham Hilton, of Moston Hall
1812 Edward Greaves of Culcheth, near Leigh
1813 William Farington of Shaw Hall, Leyland
12 February 1814: Lawrence Rawstorne, of Penwortham Hall
13 February 1815: Le Gendre Starkie, of Huntroyde Hall
1816 William Townley of Townhead, near Ulverston
1817 Robert Townley Parker of Preston (son of Thomas Townley, HS 1893)
1818 Joseph Feilden of Witton House, near Blackburn
1819 John Walmesley of Castle Mere, Rochdale
1820 Robert Hesketh of Rossall Hall, Fleetwood
1821 Thomas Richmond Gale Braddyll of Conishead Priory, Ulverston
1822 James Shuttleworth of Barton, near Preston
1823 Thomas Greene of Slyne, near Lancaster and Whittington Hall
1824 John Entwistle of Foxholes, near Rochdale
1825 John Hargreaves, of Ormerod House, Burnley
1826 James Penny Machell of Penny Bridge, over-Sands
1827 Charles Gibson of Quernmore Park, Lancaster
1828 Edmund Hornby of Dalton Hall, Burton, Westmorland
1829 Henry Bold Hoghton of Hoghton Tower
1830 Peter Hesketh, of Rossall Hall, Fleetwood; landowner, developer
1831 Peregrine Edward Towneley, of Towneley
1832 George Richard Marton, of Capernwray Hall
1833 Sir John Gerard, 12th Baronet, of Garswood and New Hall
1834 Thomas Joseph Trafford, of Trafford Park; (one of the first Roman Catholics appointed to public office after the repeal of the Test Acts)
1835 Thomas Clifton, of Lytham Hall
1836 Charles Standish, of Standish Hall
1837 Thomas Bright Crosse, of Shaw Hill, near Chorley
1838 William Blundell, of Crosby Hall
1839 Charles Scarisbrick, of Scarisbrick
1840 Thomas Fitzherbert Brockholes of Claughton Hall, near Preston
1841 Sir Thomas Bernard Birch of Liverpool
1842 Thomas Robert Wilson France of Rawcliffe Hall
1843 William Garnett of Lancaster and Salford
1844 John Fowden Hindle of Woodfold Park, near Blackburn
1845 Pudsey Dawson the younger, of Hornby Castle
1846 William Standish Standish, of Duxbury Hall
1847 William Gale, of Lightburne House, Ulverstone
1848 Sir Thomas George Hesketh of Rufford New Hall
1849 John Smith Entwistle of Foxholes, Rochdale
1850 Clement Royds, of Mount Falinge, Rochdale
1851 Thomas Percival Heywood of Pendleton
1852 Thomas Weld-Blundell of Ince Blundell, near Liverpool
1853 John Talbot Clifton of Lytham Hall
1854 Richard Fort of Read Hall, Clitheroe
1855 John Pemberton Heywood of Liverpool
1856 Robert Needham Philips of Prestwich
1857 Charles Towneley of Burnley
1858 George Marton, of Capernwray Hall
1859 Sir Robert Tolver Gerard of Ashton in Makerfield
1860 Henry Garnett of Wyreside, Lancaster
1861 Sir Humphrey de Trafford of Manchester
1862 William Allen Francis Saunders of Wennington Hall, near Lancaster
1863 Sir William Brown, Bt of Liverpool; politician and philanthropist
1864 Sir James Phillips Kay-Shuttleworth of Gawthorpe Hall
1865 William Preston of Ellel Grange, near Lancaster
1866 Sir Elkanah Armitage of Manchester
1867 Thomas Dicconson of Wigan
1868 Le Gendre Nicholas Starkie of Huntroyde Hall
1869 Benjamin Heywood Jones
1870 Henry F. Rigge of Wood Broughton, Grange-over-Sands
1871 Sir James Watts of Cheadle
1872 Thomas Wrigley of Bury
1873 Sir James Ramsden of Barrow-in-Furness
1874 Richard Smethurst of Chorley
1875 John Pearson of Newton-le-Willows
1876 Oliver Ormerod Walker of Bury
1877 George Blucher Heneage Marton of Capernwray Hall
1878 Nathaniel Eckersley of Standish Hall, Wigan
1879 William Garnett of Quernmore Park, Lancaster
1880 Ralph John Aspinall of Clitheroe
1881 William Foster of Hornby Castle
1882 George McCorquodale of Newton-le-Willows; industrialist
1883 Thomas Ashton of Didsbury, Manchester
1884 Thomas Brooks, 1st Baron Crawshaw of Rawtenstall; peer and landowner
1885 James Williamson of Lancaster; politician
1886 Sir Andrew Barclay Walker of Gateacre, near Liverpool
1887 Sir John Thursby of Burnley
1888 Oliver Heywood of Claremont, Manchester
1889 Clement Molyneux Royds of Greehill, Rochdale – twice member of Parliament for the Borough
1890 Charles Henry Bird of Cockerham
1891 George Theophilus Robert Preston replaced by Colonel William Foster of Hornby Castle
1892 John Knowles of Pendlebury
1893 Sir Thomas Storey of Lancaster; farmer and landowner
1894 Joshua W. Radcliffe of Oldham
1895 Frank Hardcastle of Bolton
1896 Sir Peter Carlew Walker of Liverpool
1897 Samuel Radcliffe Platt of Oldham
1898 William Balle Huntington of Darwen
1899 William Charles Jones of Bold, Warrington
1900 Frederick Baynes of Samlesbury Hall, near Preston

House of Saxe-Coburg-Gotha

1901 Charles Hesketh Bibby-Hesketh, of the Rockery, North Meols, Southport (later Charles Hesketh Fleetwood-Hesketh)
1902 Arthur Knowles, of Westwood, Pendlebury, and of Alvaston Hall, Nantwich
1903 Henry Whitehead of Bury
1904 Herbert Lushington Storey of Lancaster
1905 Sir John Ormerod Scarlett Thursby of Burnley
1906 Edward Tootal Broadhurst of Congleton
1907 Sir William H. Tate of Woolton
1908 Sir Thomas Brocklebank of Liverpool
1909 Sir William Bower Forwood of Bromborough
1910 Reginald Arthur Tatton of Preston
1911 Sir George Augustus Pilkington of Southport
1912 John Stone of Roby, Liverpool
1913 John William Makant of Bolton
1914 John Henry Maden of Rockcliffe House, Bacup
1915 Edward Graham Wood of Southport
1916 Percy John Hibbert of Hampsfield, Grange-over-Sands

House of Windsor

1917 Sir William Hesketh Lever of Rivington, Bolton; industrialist
1918 Col. George Hesketh of Bolton.
1919 Sir Ralph Cockayne Assheton, 1st Bt of Downham Hall, Clitheroe
1920 Edward Deakin of Linwood, Astley Bridge, Bolton
1921 George Hildyard Bankes of Winstanley Hall, Wigan
1922 Myles Kennedy of Stone Cross, Ulverston
1923 Sir Benjamin Sands Johnson of Abbot's Lea, Woolton, Liverpool
1924 Arthur Moore Lamb of Eskdale, Birkdale
1925 George Owen Sandys of Graythwaite Hall, Hawkshead
1926 John Percy Taylor of Woodside, Heaton, Bolton.
1927 Sir James Philip Reynolds, Bt of Levens Hall, Westmorland
1928 Sir Arthur Meyrick Hollins of The Coppice, Ribbleton,  Preston
1929 Charles Sydney Jones of Eastborne, Princes Park, Liverpool
1930 Samuel Turner of Bamford, Rochdale
1931 Sir Frederick Charles Bowring of Sefton Park, Liverpool
1932 Austin Townsend Porritt of Stubbins, near Bury
1933 Arthur Samuel Mitchell of West Didsbury, Manchester
1934 Sir Thomas Edward Higham of Bank House, Accrington
1935 Myles Noel Kenyon of Bury
1936 Thomas Stone of Roby
1937 William James Garnett of Quernmore Park, Lancaster
1938 Charles Eastwood of Moss House, Leyland
1939 Colonel Alan Cecil Tod of Maryton Grange, Allerton, Liverpool
1940 Edmund Barwick Clegg of Shore, Littleborough
1941 William James Garnett of Quernmore Park, Lancaster
1942 Francis Joseph Weld of Weld Road, Birkdale
1943 Sir William Fawell Ascroft of Preston
1944 Edwin Thompson, of Fulwood Park, Liverpool
1945 Colonel Sir Henry Darlington of Melling Hall, Carnforth
1946 Sir Percy Macdonald of Manchester
1947 Lt.-Col. Roger Fleetwood of Meols Hall, Southport
1948 Sir Robert Rankin, Bt of Broughton Tower, Broughton in Furness  
1949 Col. Wilfred Hugh Burton Rowley Kennedy
1950 Sir Harold Parkinson, OBE of Burnley and Hornby Castle, nr Lancaster
1951 Francis Grundy of Prestwich, nr Manchester
1952 Col. Sir John Reynolds, Bt of Liverpool
1953 Maj. Mervyn Sandys of Graythwaite Hall, nr Ulverston
1954 Col. Leonard Green of The Manor House, Whalley
1955 Sir Cuthbert Barwick Clegg of Higher Shore House, Littleborough; industrialist, chairman of the Cotton Spinners' and Manufacturers' Association.
1956 Col. Vere Egerton Cotton of Langdale, Grassendale Park, Liverpool
1957 Alan Storey of Lancaster
1958 Col. Robert Goulbourne Parker of Browsholme, Clitheroe
1959 Eric A Carpenter of Manchester 
1960 Charles Peter Fleetwood Hesketh of Manor House, Hale
1961 Col. Walter M Musgrave-Hoyle of Caton, Lancaster
1962 Col. Geoffrey George Hargreaves Bolton of Littlemoor House, Clitheroe
1963 Sir Frank Lord of Werneth, Oldham
1964 Brigadier Philip John Denton Toosey of Liverpool
1965 Lt. Col. Henry Cary Owtram of Newland Hall, Lancaster
1966 Col. Frederick William Jones of Lytham
1967 Col. Robert Ward Greenhaigh of Bolton
1968 Albert Wild of Preston
1969 Brigadier Sir Douglas Inglis Crawford of Fernlea, Mossey Hill
1970 Col. Henry John Darlington of Halton, nr Lancaster
1971 Simon Towneley of Dyneley
1972 Lt. Col. Joshua Geoffrey Barber-Lomax of Turton
1973 Henry Lumby of Ormskirk
1974 Col. Denis Arthur Sydenham Houghton of Broughton, Preston
1975 Maj. Basil Greenwood of Whalley
1976 Geoffrey Price Bowring of Halton Park; farmer and landowner
1977 Maj. Stanley Ryde Riddiough of Colne
1978 Col. Michael Albert Astley Birtwistle of Tunstall
1979 Cyril Joseph Ainscough of Parbold
1980 David Israel Goldstone replaced by Edward Anthony Nickson of Lytham
1981 Sidney Roy Fisher of Whittle-le-Woods
1982 Alexander Fordyce of Feniscowles
1983 Leonard Broughton of Blackpool
1984 Peter John James Wren of Whittle-le-Woods
1985 Edmund Christopher Parker of Browsholme, Clitheroe
1986 Edward Chambre Dickson of Goosnargh, Preston
1987 Robert Priestley Shepherd of Rossendale
1988 John Frederick Greenhough of Lytham
1989 Charles Joseph Weld-Blundell
1990 Patrick William Townsend of Gisburn
1991 John Renshaw Holt of Tatham
1992 Keith Ainsworth Gledhill of Marton
1993 Robert Rainey Craik of Mawdesley
1994 Judith Josa Duckworth of Bleasdale
1995 Ralph William Goodall of Hoghton
1996 Timothy Roy Henry Kimber of Newton Hall
1997 Sir David Austin Trippier of Dowry Head, Helmshore
1998 Charles Anthony Beresford Brennan of Hoghton
1999 The Lady Shuttleworth of Leck
2000 Rodney Newman Swarbrick of Longridge
2001 Gloria Oates
2002 Thomas Geoffrey Bowring of Halton, Lancaster
2003 Bryan Mark Gray
2004 Gail Simpson Stanley
2005 James Christopher Armfield
2006 Peter Robinson DL
2007 Ruth Roderick Winterbottom of Caton, nr Lancaster
2008 Colonel Ewart Alan Jolley TD DL
2009 Caroline Susan Reynolds DL of Carnforth
2010 Dennis George Mendoros OBE DL of Foulridge
2011 Peter Mileham
2012 M. Jeremy Gorick of Fulwood, Preston
2013: Mrs L Ann Dean
2014: Dr Barry Johnson of Preston
2015: Amanda Parker J.P., of Browsholme Hall, Clitheroe
2016: John Morris Barnett, MBE DL of Blackpool
2017: Robert Mitchel Webb, JP DL of Arkholme
2018: Anthony John William Attard, OBE DL of Preston 
2019: The Hon Ralph Christopher Assheton of Clitheroe
2020: Mrs Catherine Penny of Dutton Hall, Ribchester
2021: Edwin John Booth CBE DL Osbaldeston  
2022: Martin John Ainscough DL of Parbold Hall

References

External links
The High Sheriffs' Association of England & Wales: High Sheriffs of Lancashire
Holt Ancestry: High Sheriffs of Lancashire 1129–1947
www.earlestown.com: Newton-le-Willows & Earlestown: Newtons High Sheriffs

 
Lancashire
High Sheriff